Friedberg (b Augsburg) station is a railway station in the municipality of Friedberg, located in the district of Aichach-Friedberg in Swabia, Germany.

References

Railway stations in Bavaria
Buildings and structures in Aichach-Friedberg